Schein is a surname. Notable people with the surname include:

 Charles Schein (1928–2003), French polymer chemist of Romanian origin
 David D. Schein (born 1951), American author and academic
 Edgar Schein (born 1928), professor at the MIT Sloan School of Management
 Johann Hermann Schein (1586–1630), German composer
 Marcel Schein (1902–1960), American physicist of Bohemian origin

See also
Shine (disambiguation)